Marina Tadić (born 29 June 1983) is a Serbian pop and pop-folk singer.

Biography
She was born 29 June 1983 in Valjevo and lives in Belgrade. She has been interested in music and acting arts since her childhood, was a member of school drama classes and acted in school plays. She graduated at  faculty in Novi Sad; while studying, she has shortly been a professor of swimming school. She had a radio show and sold pictures in a photo shop at weekends. She knew many musicians from Valjevo and started to perform with them, with her parents not supporting her in favor of the faculty.

She released her first album in December 2008, with songs "Još sam ona stara", "Ljubi, ljubi" and "Nisi bio tu" among others. In 2010 she released a single "Bilo nam je mega, mega". In 2011 she promoted another single, "Disco devojka", with music video. In 2012 she recorded her second album, with City Records label again; the most listened songs, that became hits, are "Bol za bol" and "Otrove".

In 2013 she got a role of Nikolina in the season 3 of a Serbian-Montenegrin TV show , where she collaborated with Mima Karadžić. She also had a guest appearance in a Serbian TV show .

She was part of the campaign '' and recorded a song "Moj lepi skote" relating to this.

In 2014 she promoted a single "Zaboravi". In 2015 she released feat "Sama" with Marko Đurovski and a single "Novi život". In 2016, song "Ljubav stara" saw its audience, and Tadić announced a new album of autobiographical character, U zagrljaju tvom with Grand Production. Her 2017 single's "Ubica" authors are Jala Brat and Buba Corelli, with Jala Brat being also a post-chorus singer.

In the private life, she has been linked—by various media—with former football player Mateja Kežman, former water polo player Vanja Udovičić and a basketball player Miloš Teodosić, as well as retired football player Ivica Dragutinović. She likes sports and ordinarily visits a gym.

Discography

Albums
Nisi bio tu (2008)
Bol za bol (2012)
U zagrljaju tvom (2016)

Singles 

"Bilo nam je mega, mega" (2010) [also included on Bol za bol as a bonus track]
"Disco devojka" (2011)
"Zaboravi" (2014)
"Novi život" (2015)
"Nisi veran" (2015)
"Gde to ima" (2016)
"Ubica" (2017)
"Ljubi, ljubi" (2017)
"Čujem" (2018)
"Na viskiju" (2019)

References

External links

Article on Hottestmv.com

1983 births
Living people
Musicians from Valjevo
21st-century Serbian women singers
Serbian folk-pop singers